Magdalena Suarez Frimkess (1929) born in Caracas, Venezuela and is a Venezuelan artist who works in ceramics and is best known for her sculpture-like cartoon characters and advertisement artworks.

Early life and education 
Magdalena was redirected to an orphanage center at the age of seven after losing her mother to tuberculosis as her father was not able to provide Suarez financial stability. While at the orphanage center in Caracas, she discovered a joy for painting. She received her education at the School of the Plastic Arts where they encouraged Magdalena to have a career in painting. She then moved to Chile when she was eighteen years old and met her first partner who remains anonymous. After the birth of her two children, she attended Catholic University Santiago, Chile where she enrolled in sculpture and painting courses to reconnect with her artistic practice again after taking some time off to take care of her children.

After Chile, she was offered a fellowship to the Clay Art Center in New York, NY where she met her husband Michael Frimkess who is also a ceramist and artist. They both then resided to Venice, California as they collaborate and work together in their studio.

Art 
Suarez creates sculpture-like cartoon characters, vases, and mugs that often involve slogans and advertisements. One of her most famous works is of Popeye and Mickey and Minnie Mouse and other Disney characters. Although, most of Magdalena's work is small-scale, many people have pushed her to work in a larger scale. She enjoys making small objects and sculptures. Magdalena's sculptural body of works were often viewed as dysfunctional during her time in ceramic school but did not stop her from creating these forms. She also appropriates Aztec and Mayan imagery into her work of vessels. Suarez works with her husband, Michael Frimkess who have been working together since 1963. Magdalena glazes each pot as Michael works in throwing pottery traditionally. They have had exhibitions together like at The Hammer Museum and many more. Magdalena had her first solo exhibition in 2013 when she was 84 years old that took place at South Willard gallery in Los Angeles, California. She will have an upcoming solo exhibition at LACMA in 2022.

Exhibitions 

   Magdalena Suarez Frimkess, South Willard gallery, Los Angeles, California 2013
   Grapevine ~, David Kordansky Gallery, Los Angeles, California 2013
   The Cat Show, White Columns gallery, New York City 2013
   Project Room: Magdalena Suarez Frimkess, White Columns gallery, New York City 2014
   Magdalena Suarez Frimkess and Michael Frimkess: Made In L.A., The Hammer Museum, Los Angeles, California 2014
   Looking Back, White Columns gallery, New York City 2015
  The Frimkess Collection, The Nevica Project gallery, Chicago and Kansas City
  Magdalena Suarez Frimkess, Kaufmann Repetto gallery, Milan, Italy 2016
  Magdalena Suraez Frimkess, Kaufmann Repetto gallery, Milan, Italy 2017
  Magdalena Suarez Frimkess: New York, South Willard gallery, Los Angeles, California 2018
  Magdalena Suarez Frimkess: Stoneware and Drawings, South Willard gallery, Los Angeles, California 2020
  Magdalena Suarez Frimkess: 90, South Willard gallery, Los Angeles, California 2021
 Magdalena Suraez Frimkess artificies instables, histoires de ceramiques, Kaufmann Repetto gallery, Milan, Italy 2021
 Magdalena Suarez Frimkess: drawings, Kaufmann Repetto gallery, Milan, Italy 2021-2022
  Magadalena Suarez Frimkess, Los Angeles County Museum of Art (LACMA), Los Angeles, California 2022

Further reading 

  Finkel J. (2014). Biennial’s Bright Young Things, Ages 77 and 84. The New York Times, New York, NY.
  Holte Ned M. (2020). Condorito Has Answers for Everything: Magdalena Suarez Frimkess. Mousse Magazine. Milan, Italy.
  Swallow R. (2019). Magdalena Suarez Frimkess. South Willard Press. Los Angeles, CA. , .

References

External links 
 Artist Website

Wikipedia Student Program
1929 births
Living people
People from Caracas